Lamentin is a commune in the French overseas department and region of Guadeloupe. It is part of the agglomeration of Pointe-à-Pitre, in the north part of Basse-Terre. Three islets are included in the commune: Christopher, Fajou, Caret.

History
Founded in 1720 in the commune's name comes from a French word for manatee (lamantin), a sea creature which used to inhabit the Lesser Antilles. In the 18th century, the commune underwent a boom, down to coffee, caco, cotton and sugar cane. In 1920, a cyclone destroyed the mayor's office and presbytery, which have since been rebuilt by Ali Tur.

Population

Tourism
Lamentin is home to La Ravine Chaude (The hot ravine), a thermal bathing centre.

Education
Public preschools include:
 Ecole maternelle le Verger de Castel
 Ecole maternelle Julien Chabin
 Ecole maternelle Blanche Pierre
 Ecole maternelle Pierrette

Public primary schools include:
 Ecole primaire Bourg 1 Lamentin
 Ecole primaire Bourg 2 Lamentin
 Ecole primaire Castel
 Ecole primaire La Rozière
 Ecole primaire Pierrette
 Ecole primaire Vincent

Public junior high schools include:
 Collège Appel du 18 juin

Public senior high schools include:
 LDM de l'habitat et des services associés Bertène Juminer

Personalities
René Toribio (1912-1990), politician

References

External links

Communes of Guadeloupe
Populated places established in 1720
1720 establishments in the French colonial empire